Alekseyevskaya is a station on the Moscow Metro's Kaluzhsko-Rizhskaya line. It serves Alexeyevsky District. The station's round entrance is located on the east side of Prospekt Mira between Staroalexeyevskaya and Novoalexeyevskaya streets. From its opening in 1958 to 1966 the station was known as "Mir" and thus bore the shortest name in the history of the Moscow Metro.

History

It was designed by S. Kravets, Yu. Kolesnikova, and G. Golubev and opened on 1 May 1958. The station was originally planned to be as heavily decorated as previous stations, but the design was modified due to Khrushchev's opposition to unnecessary decorative elements. As a result, Alexeyevskaya has surprisingly clean lines for a station built in the 1950s.  Its octagonal pylons are white marble with green stripes, and the arches, ceiling, and ventilation grilles are painted white. Lighting comes from restrained yet elegant chandeliers.

The station was originally named Mir, but was changed to Scherbakovskaya in 1966 in honor of Aleksandr Shcherbakov, a founding member of the Union of Soviet Writers. In November 1990, the city renamed the station Alekseyevskaya for the historical settlement of Alekseyevskoye, which once belonged to Prince Dmitry Troubetskoy.

References

Moscow Metro stations
Railway stations in Russia opened in 1958
Kaluzhsko-Rizhskaya Line
Railway stations located underground in Russia
Cultural heritage monuments in Moscow